The 2012 St. George Illawarra Dragons season will be the 14th in the joint venture club's history.

Pre Season

Regular season
Knights 14 lost to Dragons 15
Bulldogs 30 beat Dragons 4
Dragons 36 beat Tigers 12
Dragons 17 beat Sea Eagles 6
Broncos 28 beat Dragons 20
Sharks 12 beat Dragons 0
Dragons 12 beat Knights 4
Dragons 28 beat Roosters 24

Ladder

Squad

Transfers
New Signings
Chase Stanley from Melbourne Storm
Daniel Vidot from Canberra Raiders
Josh Miller from Canberra Raiders
Leeson Ah Mau from North Queensland Cowboys
Atelea Vea from Melbourne Storm 
Jeremy Latimore from New Zealand Warriors
Will Matthews from Gold Coast Titans
Denan Kemp from Southern Districts Rugby Club

Transfers/leaving
Darius Boyd to Newcastle Knights
Jon Green to Cronulla Sharks
Michael Greenfield to Melbourne Storm 
Adam Cuthbertson to Newcastle Knights
Peni Tagive to Sydney Roosters
Daniel Penese to Parramatta Eels
Jack Bosden to Sydney Roosters
Mark Gasnier Retired
Reece Simmonds Retired
Peter Cronin released

References

St. George Illawarra Dragons seasons
St. George Illawarra Dragons season